is an annual mixed martial arts competition held in Japan. Originally arranged by promoter and former professional wrestler Satoru Sayama, he had previously created a hybrid martial art organization named Shooto in 1985. He arranged VTJ in 1994 with the objective of creating a more rules-free event similar to the early Ultimate Fighting Championship events in the United States and Vale Tudo competitions in Brazil, previously to this tournament, Shooto did not feature striking in ground position. The fighters were composed by the best Japanese MMA fighters drawn from Shooto, the Shoot Wrestling circuit as well as foreign invitees, one of them and most famously begin the older brother of UFC champion Royce Gracie, Brazilian jiu-jitsu legend Rickson Gracie. Some other notable fighters to fight at Vale Tudo Japan include Sanae Kikuta, Takanori Gomi, Enson Inoue, João Roque, Carlos Newton, Rumina Sato, Royler Gracie, Dan Severn, Vladimir Matyushenko, Frank Shamrock, Jean Jacques Machado,  Randy Couture, Frank Trigg, André Pederneiras, Rafael Cordeiro, Alexandre Franca Nogueira, Hayato Sakurai, and Yuki Nakai. Vale Tudo Japan events ran from 1994 to 1999, a pair of editions held in 1994 and '95 were single-elimination tournaments, both of which were won by Rickson Gracie. Afterwards, from 1996 to 1999 the events were invitationals.

Vale Tudo Japan returned in 2009, now organizing by the "Vale Tudo Japan Executive Committee", with semi-annual events and three reunion events in 2009, 2012 and 2016.

Early Vale Tudo Japan events were a huge success, it led to a boom of the popularity and development of MMA and Shooto in Japan, and the tournament is considered a predecessor to PRIDE Fighting Championships. VTJ's format and rules would serve as a basis for PRIDE, while Rickson Gracie's impressive victories in VTJ would make him a celebrity in Japan, leading to him being paired with popular Shoot-style professional wrestler Nobuhiko Takada to headline Pride 1 in 1997.

Events and results

Vale Tudo Japan 1994

Vale Tudo Japan 1994 was held on July 29, 1994, at the Tokyo Bay NK Hall in Urayasu, Japan.

Vale Tudo Japan 1995

Vale Tudo Japan 1995 was held on April 20, 1995, at the Nippon Budokan Hall in Chiyoda, Tokyo, Japan.

Vale Tudo Japan 1996

Vale Tudo Japan 1996 was held on July 7, 1996, at the Tokyo Bay NK Hall in Urayasu, Japan.

Vale Tudo Japan 1997

Vale Tudo Japan 1997 was held on November 29, 1997, at the Tokyo Bay NK Hall in Urayasu, Japan.

Vale Tudo Japan 1998

Vale Tudo Japan 1998 was held on October 25, 1998, at the Tokyo Bay NK Hall in Urayasu, Japan.

Vale Tudo Japan 1999

Vale Tudo Japan 1999 was held on December 11, 1999, at the Tokyo Bay NK Hall in Urayasu, Japan.

Vale Tudo Japan 2009

Vale Tudo Japan 2009 was held on October 30, 2009, at the JCB Hall in Tokyo, Japan.

Vale Tudo Japan: VTJ 1st

Vale Tudo Japan: VTJ 1st (also known as VTJ 1ST) was held on December 24, 2012, at the Yoyogi National Gymnasium in Tokyo, Japan.

Vale Tudo Japan: VTJ 2nd

Vale Tudo Japan: VTJ 2nd (also known as VTJ 2ND) was held on June 22, 2013, at the Tokyo Dome City Hall in Tokyo, Japan.

Vale Tudo Japan: VTJ 3rd

Vale Tudo Japan: VTJ 3rd (also known as VTJ 3RD) was held on October 5, 2013, at Ota City General Gymnasium in Ota, Tokyo, Japan. The main event featured longtime # 1 ranked Megumi Fujii in her retirement bout.

Vale Tudo Japan: VTJ 4th

Vale Tudo Japan: VTJ 4th (also known as VTJ 4TH) was held on February 23, 2014, at Ota City General Gymnasium in Ota, Tokyo, Japan.

Vale Tudo Japan: VTJ 5th in Osaka

Vale Tudo Japan: VTJ 5th in Osaka (also known as VTJ 5TH IN OSAKA) was held on June 28, 2014, at Bodymaker Colosseum in Osaka, Japan.

Vale Tudo Japan: VTJ 6th

Vale Tudo Japan: VTJ 6th (also known as VTJ 6TH) was held on October 4, 2014, at Ota City General Gymnasium in Ōta, Tokyo, Japan.

References

External links
 Official Website
 Vale Tudo Japan Results on Sherdog.com

Vale Tudo
Mixed martial arts in Japan
Mixed martial arts organizations
Mixed martial arts events
Sports competitions in Japan